Troitsky (masculine), Troitskaya (feminine), or Troitskoye (neuter) is the name of several rural localities in Russia.

Modern localities

Altai Krai
As of 2010, three rural localities in Altai Krai bear this name:
Troitsky, Altai Krai, a settlement in Zavetilyichevsky Selsoviet of Aleysky District
Troitskoye, Troitsky District, Altai Krai, a selo in Troitsky Selsoviet of Troitsky District
Troitskoye, Ust-Pristansky District, Altai Krai, a selo in Troitsky Selsoviet of Ust-Pristansky District

Amur Oblast
As of 2010, one rural locality in Amur Oblast bears this name:
Troitskoye, Amur Oblast, a selo in Troitsky Rural Settlement of Ivanovsky District

Arkhangelsk Oblast
As of 2014, one rural locality in Arkhangelsk Oblast bears this name:
Troitskaya, Arkhangelsk Oblast, a village in Puchuzhsky Selsoviet of Verkhnetoyemsky District

Astrakhan Oblast
As of 2010, one rural locality in Astrakhan Oblast bears this name:
Troitsky, Astrakhan Oblast, a settlement in Sergiyevsky Selsoviet of Ikryaninsky District

Republic of Bashkortostan
As of 2010, three rural localities in the Republic of Bashkortostan bear this name:
Troitsky, Republic of Bashkortostan, a selo in Troitsky Selsoviet of Blagovarsky District
Troitskoye, Arkhangelsky District, Republic of Bashkortostan, a village in Krasnokurtovsky Selsoviet of Arkhangelsky District
Troitskoye, Meleuzovsky District, Republic of Bashkortostan, a selo in Partizansky Selsoviet of Meleuzovsky District

Belgorod Oblast
As of 2010, one rural locality in Belgorod Oblast bears this name:
Troitsky, Belgorod Oblast, a settlement in Gubkinsky District

Bryansk Oblast
As of 2010, two rural localities in Bryansk Oblast bear this name:
Troitsky, Bryansk Oblast, a settlement in Lopandinsky Selsoviet of Komarichsky District
Troitskoye, Bryansk Oblast, a selo in Voronovsky Selsoviet of Rognedinsky District

Republic of Buryatia
As of 2010, two rural localities in the Republic of Buryatia bear this name:
Troitsky, Republic of Buryatia, a settlement in Bagdarinsky Selsoviet of Bauntovsky District
Troitskoye, Republic of Buryatia, a selo in Talovsky Selsoviet of Pribaykalsky District

Chuvash Republic
As of 2010, one rural locality in the Chuvash Republic bears this name:
Troitskoye, Chuvash Republic, a village in Maloyaushskoye Rural Settlement of Vurnarsky District

Republic of Ingushetia
As of 2010, one rural locality in the Republic of Ingushetia bears this name:
Troitskaya, Republic of Ingushetia, a stanitsa in Sunzhensky District

Republic of Kalmykia
As of 2010, one rural locality in the Republic of Kalmykia bears this name:
Troitskoye, Republic of Kalmykia, a selo in Troitskaya Rural Administration of Tselinny District

Kaluga Oblast
As of 2010, five rural localities in Kaluga Oblast bear this name:
Troitskoye, Ferzikovsky District, Kaluga Oblast, a village in Ferzikovsky District
Troitskoye, Kuybyshevsky District, Kaluga Oblast, a selo in Kuybyshevsky District
Troitskoye (selo), Medynsky District, Kaluga Oblast, a selo in Medynsky District
Troitskoye (village), Medynsky District, Kaluga Oblast, a village in Medynsky District
Troitskoye, Zhukovsky District, Kaluga Oblast, a selo in Zhukovsky District

Kemerovo Oblast
As of 2010, one rural locality in Kemerovo Oblast bears this name:
Troitskoye, Kemerovo Oblast, a selo in Troitskaya Rural Territory of Izhmorsky District

Khabarovsk Krai
As of 2010, one rural locality in Khabarovsk Krai bears this name:
Troitskoye, Khabarovsk Krai, a selo in Nanaysky District

Republic of Khakassia
As of 2010, one rural locality in the Republic of Khakassia bears this name:
Troitskoye, Republic of Khakassia, a selo in Troitsky Selsoviet of Bogradsky District

Kirov Oblast
As of 2010, two rural localities in Kirov Oblast bear this name:
Troitsky, Kirov Oblast, a pochinok in Savalsky Rural Okrug of Malmyzhsky District
Troitskoye, Kirov Oblast, a selo in Selinsky Rural Okrug of Kilmezsky District

Kostroma Oblast
As of 2010, three rural localities in Kostroma Oblast bear this name:
Troitskoye, Antropovsky District, Kostroma Oblast, a village in Kotelnikovskoye Settlement of Antropovsky District
Troitskoye, Sharyinsky District, Kostroma Oblast, a selo in Troitskoye Settlement of Sharyinsky District
Troitskoye, Susaninsky District, Kostroma Oblast, a village in Severnoye Settlement of Susaninsky District

Krasnodar Krai
As of 2010, three rural localities in Krasnodar Krai bear this name:
Troitsky, Otradnensky District, Krasnodar Krai, a khutor in Krasnogvardeysky Rural Okrug of Otradnensky District
Troitsky, Slavyansky District, Krasnodar Krai, a khutor in Mayevsky Rural Okrug of Slavyansky District
Troitskaya, Krasnodar Krai, a stanitsa in Troitsky Rural Okrug of Krymsky District

Krasnoyarsk Krai
As of 2014, one rural locality in Krasnoyarsk Krai bears this name:
Troitskoye, Krasnoyarsk Krai, a village in Predivinsky Selsoviet of Bolshemurtinsky District

Kurgan Oblast
As of 2010, two rural localities in Kurgan Oblast bear this name:
Troitskoye, Mishkinsky District, Kurgan Oblast, a village in Kupaysky Selsoviet of Mishkinsky District
Troitskoye, Petukhovsky District, Kurgan Oblast, a selo in Troitsky Selsoviet of Petukhovsky District

Kursk Oblast
As of 2010, seven rural localities in Kursk Oblast bear this name:
Troitsky, Kursk Oblast, a khutor in Naumovsky Selsoviet of Konyshyovsky District
Troitskoye, Korenevsky District, Kursk Oblast, a selo in Gordeyevsky Selsoviet of Korenevsky District
Troitskoye, Kurchatovsky District, Kursk Oblast, a village in Nikolayevsky Selsoviet of Kurchatovsky District
Troitskoye, Bobryshevsky Selsoviet, Pristensky District, Kursk Oblast, a selo in Bobryshevsky Selsoviet of Pristensky District
Troitskoye, Verkhneploskovsky Selsoviet, Pristensky District, Kursk Oblast, a selo in Verkhneploskovsky Selsoviet of Pristensky District
Troitskoye, Sovetsky District, Kursk Oblast, a village in Verkhneragozetsky Selsoviet of Sovetsky District
Troitskoye, Zheleznogorsky District, Kursk Oblast, a selo in Troitsky Selsoviet of Zheleznogorsky District

Lipetsk Oblast
As of 2010, four rural localities in Lipetsk Oblast bear this name:
Troitskoye, Dolgorukovsky District, Lipetsk Oblast, a village in Svishensky Selsoviet of Dolgorukovsky District
Troitskoye, Izmalkovsky District, Lipetsk Oblast, a selo in Chernavsky Selsoviet of Izmalkovsky District
Troitskoye, Lev-Tolstovsky District, Lipetsk Oblast, a selo in Troitsky Selsoviet of Lev-Tolstovsky District
Troitskoye, Lipetsky District, Lipetsk Oblast, a selo in Leninsky Selsoviet of Lipetsky District

Mari El Republic
As of 2010, one rural locality in the Mari El Republic bears this name:
Troitsky, Mari El Republic, a vyselok in Ardinsky Rural Okrug of Kilemarsky District

Republic of Mordovia
As of 2010, one rural locality in the Republic of Mordovia bears this name:
Troitsky, Republic of Mordovia, a settlement in Obrochinsky Selsoviet of Ichalkovsky District

Moscow Oblast
As of 2010, seven rural localities in Moscow Oblast bear this name:
Troitsky, Moscow Oblast, a settlement in Ivanovskoye Rural Settlement of Istrinsky District
Troitskoye, Chekhovsky District, Moscow Oblast, a selo in Lyubuchanskoye Rural Settlement of Chekhovsky District
Troitskoye, Nudolskoye Rural Settlement, Klinsky District, Moscow Oblast, a village in Nudolskoye Rural Settlement of Klinsky District
Troitskoye, Vysokovsk, Klinsky District, Moscow Oblast, a village under the administrative jurisdiction of the Town of Vysokovsk in Klinsky District
Troitskoye, Mytishchinsky District, Moscow Oblast, a selo under the administrative jurisdiction of the Town of Mytishchi in Mytishchinsky District
Troitskoye, Odintsovsky District, Moscow Oblast, a selo in Nikolskoye Rural Settlement of Odintsovsky District
Troitskoye, Podolsky District, Moscow Oblast, a village in Shchapovskoye Rural Settlement of Podolsky District

Nizhny Novgorod Oblast
As of 2010, two rural localities in Nizhny Novgorod Oblast bear this name:
Troitskoye, Knyagininsky District, Nizhny Novgorod Oblast, a selo in Ananyevsky Selsoviet of Knyagininsky District
Troitskoye, Voskresensky District, Nizhny Novgorod Oblast, a selo in Staroustinsky Selsoviet of Voskresensky District

Republic of North Ossetia–Alania
As of 2010, one rural locality in the Republic of North Ossetia–Alania bears this name:
Troitskoye, Republic of North Ossetia–Alania, a selo in Troitsky Rural Okrug of Mozdoksky District

Novosibirsk Oblast
As of 2010, four rural localities in Novosibirsk Oblast bear this name:
Troitsky, Novosibirsk Oblast, a settlement in Kochkovsky District
Troitskoye, Bagansky District, Novosibirsk Oblast, a selo in Bagansky District
Troitskoye, Chistoozyorny District, Novosibirsk Oblast, a selo in Chistoozyorny District
Troitskoye, Karasuksky District, Novosibirsk Oblast, a selo in Karasuksky District

Omsk Oblast
As of 2010, one rural locality in Omsk Oblast bears this name:
Troitskoye, Omsk Oblast, a selo in Troitsky Rural Okrug of Omsky District

Orenburg Oblast
As of 2010, five rural localities in Orenburg Oblast bear this name:
Troitsky, Orenburg Oblast, a settlement in Krasnokholmsky Selsoviet of the City of Orenburg
Troitskoye, Asekeyevsky District, Orenburg Oblast, a selo in Troitsky Selsoviet of Asekeyevsky District
Troitskoye, Buzuluksky District, Orenburg Oblast, a selo in Troitsky Selsoviet of Buzuluksky District
Troitskoye, Sorochinsky District, Orenburg Oblast, a selo in Fedorovsky Selsoviet of Sorochinsky District
Troitskoye, Tyulgansky District, Orenburg Oblast, a selo in Troitsky Selsoviet of Tyulgansky District

Oryol Oblast
As of 2010, eight rural localities in Oryol Oblast bear this name:
Troitsky, Soskovsky District, Oryol Oblast, a settlement in Alpeyevsky Selsoviet of Soskovsky District
Troitsky, Trosnyansky District, Oryol Oblast, a settlement in Pennovsky Selsoviet of Trosnyansky District
Troitskoye, Livensky District, Oryol Oblast, a selo in Belomestnensky Selsoviet of Livensky District
Troitskoye, Novosilsky District, Oryol Oblast, a selo in Glubkovsky Selsoviet of Novosilsky District
Troitskoye, Orlovsky District, Oryol Oblast, a selo in Troitsky Selsoviet of Orlovsky District
Troitskoye, Pokrovsky District, Oryol Oblast, a village in Stolbetsky Selsoviet of Pokrovsky District
Troitskoye, Sverdlovsky District, Oryol Oblast, a selo in Koshelevsky Selsoviet of Sverdlovsky District
Troitskoye, Verkhovsky District, Oryol Oblast, a selo in Telyazhensky Selsoviet of Verkhovsky District

Penza Oblast
As of 2010, two rural localities in Penza Oblast bear this name:
Troitskoye, Bashmakovsky District, Penza Oblast, a selo in Troitsky Selsoviet of Bashmakovsky District
Troitskoye, Pachelmsky District, Penza Oblast, a selo in Sheynsky Selsoviet of Pachelmsky District

Primorsky Krai
As of 2010, one rural locality in Primorsky Krai bears this name:
Troitskoye, Primorsky Krai, a selo in Khankaysky District

Pskov Oblast
As of 2010, one rural locality in Pskov Oblast bears this name:
Troitskoye, Pskov Oblast, a village in Pechorsky District

Rostov Oblast
As of 2010, three rural localities in Rostov Oblast bear this name:
Troitsky, Morozovsky District, Rostov Oblast, a khutor in Shiroko-Atamanovskoye Rural Settlement of Morozovsky District
Troitsky, Orlovsky District, Rostov Oblast, a khutor in Kamenno-Balkovskoye Rural Settlement of Orlovsky District
Troitskoye, Rostov Oblast, a selo in Troitskoye Rural Settlement of Neklinovsky District

Ryazan Oblast
As of 2010, three rural localities in Ryazan Oblast bear this name:
Troitskoye, Sarayevsky District, Ryazan Oblast, a selo in Troitsky Rural Okrug of Sarayevsky District
Troitskoye, Shatsky District, Ryazan Oblast, a village in Fedosovsky Rural Okrug of Shatsky District
Troitskoye, Zakharovsky District, Ryazan Oblast, a selo in Smenovsky Rural Okrug of Zakharovsky District

Sakhalin Oblast
As of 2010, one rural locality in Sakhalin Oblast bears this name:
Troitskoye, Sakhalin Oblast, a selo in Anivsky District

Samara Oblast
As of 2010, three rural localities in Samara Oblast bear this name:
Troitskoye, Bezenchuksky District, Samara Oblast, a selo in Bezenchuksky District
Troitskoye, Syzransky District, Samara Oblast, a selo in Syzransky District
Troitskaya, Samara Oblast, a village in Yelkhovsky District

Smolensk Oblast
As of 2010, four rural localities in Smolensk Oblast bear this name:
Troitsky, Smolensk Oblast, a village in Gryazenyatskoye Rural Settlement of Roslavlsky District
Troitskoye, Demidovsky District, Smolensk Oblast, a village in Zaboryevskoye Rural Settlement of Demidovsky District
Troitskoye, Dukhovshchinsky District, Smolensk Oblast, a village in Tretyakovskoye Rural Settlement of Dukhovshchinsky District
Troitskoye, Monastyrshchinsky District, Smolensk Oblast, a village in Barsukovskoye Rural Settlement of Monastyrshchinsky District

Stavropol Krai
As of 2010, one rural locality in Stavropol Krai bears this name:
Troitsky, Stavropol Krai, a settlement in Kucherlinsky Selsoviet of Turkmensky District

Sverdlovsk Oblast
As of 2010, four rural localities in Sverdlovsk Oblast bear this name:
Troitsky, Sverdlovsk Oblast, a settlement in Talitsky District
Troitskoye, Bogdanovichsky District, Sverdlovsk Oblast, a selo in Bogdanovichsky District
Troitskoye, Garinsky District, Sverdlovsk Oblast, a village in Garinsky District
Troitskoye, Kamensky District, Sverdlovsk Oblast, a selo in Kamensky District

Tambov Oblast
As of 2010, four rural localities in Tambov Oblast bear this name:
Troitsky, Petrovsky District, Tambov Oblast, a settlement in Petrovsky Selsoviet of Petrovsky District
Troitsky, Tambovsky District, Tambov Oblast, a settlement in Avdeyevsky Selsoviet of Tambovsky District
Troitskoye, Muchkapsky District, Tambov Oblast, a selo in Troitsky Selsoviet of Muchkapsky District
Troitskoye, Umyotsky District, Tambov Oblast, a village in Sulaksky Selsoviet of Umyotsky District

Republic of Tatarstan
As of 2010, two rural localities in the Republic of Tatarstan bear this name:
Troitsky, Laishevsky District, Republic of Tatarstan, a settlement in Laishevsky District
Troitsky, Nizhnekamsky District, Republic of Tatarstan, a settlement in Nizhnekamsky District

Tula Oblast
As of 2010, five rural localities in Tula Oblast bear this name:
Troitsky, Chernsky District, Tula Oblast, a settlement in Solovyevskaya Rural Administration of Chernsky District
Troitsky, Kireyevsky District, Tula Oblast, a settlement in Dedilovsky Rural Okrug of Kireyevsky District
Troitskoye, Arsenyevsky District, Tula Oblast, a selo in Belokolodezsky Rural Okrug of Arsenyevsky District
Troitskoye, Uzlovsky District, Tula Oblast, a selo in Rakitinskaya Rural Administration of Uzlovsky District
Troitskoye, Yasnogorsky District, Tula Oblast, a village in Burakovskaya Rural Territory of Yasnogorsky District

Tver Oblast
As of 2010, six rural localities in Tver Oblast bear this name:
Troitskoye, Kalininsky District, Tver Oblast, a village in Kalininsky District
Troitskoye, Kashinsky District, Tver Oblast, a village in Kashinsky District
Troitskoye, Torzhoksky District, Tver Oblast, a village in Torzhoksky District
Troitskoye, Zapadnodvinsky District, Tver Oblast, a village in Zapadnodvinsky District
Troitskoye, Zharkovsky District, Tver Oblast, a village in Zharkovsky District
Troitskoye, Zubtsovsky District, Tver Oblast, a village in Zubtsovsky District

Tyumen Oblast
As of 2010, one rural locality in Tyumen Oblast bears this name:
Troitskoye, Tyumen Oblast, a selo in Antipinsky Rural Okrug of Nizhnetavdinsky District

Udmurt Republic
As of 2010, one rural locality in the Udmurt Republic bears this name:
Troitskoye, Udmurt Republic, a village in Srednepostolsky Selsoviet of Zavyalovsky District

Ulyanovsk Oblast
As of 2010, one rural locality in Ulyanovsk Oblast bears this name:
Troitskoye, Ulyanovsk Oblast, a selo under the administrative jurisdiction of the town of district significance of Inza in Inzensky District

Volgograd Oblast
As of 2010, two rural localities in Volgograd Oblast bear this name:
Troitsky, Mikhaylovsky District, Volgograd Oblast, a khutor in Troitsky Selsoviet of Mikhaylovsky District
Troitsky, Uryupinsky District, Volgograd Oblast, a khutor in Loshchinovsky Selsoviet of Uryupinsky District

Vologda Oblast
As of 2010, three rural localities in Vologda Oblast bear this name:
Troitskoye, Cherepovetsky District, Vologda Oblast, a village in Ivanovsky Selsoviet of Cherepovetsky District
Troitskoye, Gryazovetsky District, Vologda Oblast, a village in Yurovsky Selsoviet of Gryazovetsky District
Troitskoye, Vashkinsky District, Vologda Oblast, a selo in Kisnemsky Selsoviet of Vashkinsky District

Voronezh Oblast
As of 2010, six rural localities in Voronezh Oblast bear this name:
Troitsky, Buturlinovsky District, Voronezh Oblast, a settlement in Karaychevskoye Rural Settlement of Buturlinovsky District
Troitsky, Talovsky District, Voronezh Oblast, a settlement in Alexandrovskoye Rural Settlement of Talovsky District
Troitsky, Verkhnekhavsky District, Voronezh Oblast, a settlement in Spasskoye Rural Settlement of Verkhnekhavsky District
Troitskoye, Liskinsky District, Voronezh Oblast, a selo in Troitskoye Rural Settlement of Liskinsky District
Troitskoye, Novokhopyorsky District, Voronezh Oblast, a selo in Troitskoye Rural Settlement of Novokhopyorsky District
Troitskoye, Semiluksky District, Voronezh Oblast, a selo in Novosilskoye Rural Settlement of Semiluksky District

Yaroslavl Oblast
As of 2010, six rural localities in Yaroslavl Oblast bear this name:
Troitskoye, Borisoglebsky District, Yaroslavl Oblast, a village in Pokrovsky Rural Okrug of Borisoglebsky District
Troitskoye, Nekrasovsky District, Yaroslavl Oblast, a selo in Burmakinsky Rural Okrug of Nekrasovsky District
Troitskoye, Lychensky Rural Okrug, Pereslavsky District, Yaroslavl Oblast, a selo in Lychensky Rural Okrug of Pereslavsky District
Troitskoye, Veskovsky Rural Okrug, Pereslavsky District, Yaroslavl Oblast, a village in Veskovsky Rural Okrug of Pereslavsky District
Troitskoye, Uglichsky District, Yaroslavl Oblast, a selo in Ilyinsky Rural Okrug of Uglichsky District
Troitskoye, Yaroslavsky District, Yaroslavl Oblast, a village in Tolbukhinsky Rural Okrug of Yaroslavsky District

Abolished localities
Troitsky, Arkhangelsk Oblast, a khutor in Solovetsky District of Arkhangelsk Oblast; abolished in December 2014

Historical names
Troitskoye, former name of Mamadysh, a town in Mamadyshsky District of the Republic of Tatarstan

References

Notes

Sources